Soraya Bahgat is a Finnish-Egyptian social entrepreneur and women’s rights advocate active in Egypt.
 
In 2012, she founded Tahrir Bodyguard, a movement comprising uniformed volunteers to protect women from the mob sexual assaults in Tahrir Square.

Early life 
Bahgat was born in Finland to Egyptian parents. Her family moved to Egypt when she was seven years old.

Tahrir Bodyguard

While at the office and on the way to Tahrir Square to join mass protests, Soraya Bahgat decided to launch Tahrir Bodyguard following a panic attack over safety concerns amidst the ongoing mob sexual assaults.

Recognizing the power of Twitter, she immediately took to the site to start an account and started tweeting safety tips and calls for volunteers. In an interview with The Atlantic she stated that she was overwhelmed by the account’s immediate reach, with over 600 followers during the first 2 hours.
 
She recruited a core group of trusted individuals to help her build the movement’s foundations and recruit the volunteers. She started by purchasing 200 uniforms comprising construction helmets and neon vests and soon enough the group managed to recruit the needed volunteers. The volunteers' uniforms comprising construction helmets and neon vests were intended to protect the volunteers and make them easily visible at night.

Tahir Bodyguard operated in two ways. First, the group proactively patrolled Tahrir Square and its surroundings to protect the women and identify areas where assaults could occur. Second, the group engaged with the mobs to free women being assaulted and take them to ambulances stationed outside the square.
 
At the beginning, she was anonymous and gave an interview to Gawker in December 2012 using a pseudonym. In February 2013, her name and occupation were revealed in a profile by the Associated Press.
 
During down times where there was no activity in Tahrir Square, the group offered free self-defense classes for women to empower them to own the streets.

Women’s Advocacy and Community Engagement
She is a member of the Strategic Advisory Group of The Girl Generation, the Africa-led movement to end female genital mutilation in one generation.
Italian-Egyptian model, actress and philanthropist Elisa Sednaoui has named her as a friend and collaborator on her foundation’s website.  In 2014, Soraya became one of the nonprofit organization’s trustees promoting creative learning through special after-school programs for disadvantaged youngsters in Egypt and other countries.
Between 2008 and 2012, she served on the board of the Gezira Youth Center.

Public Appearances
Together with her Tahrir Bodyguard colleagues she appeared in a France 24 documentary by French journalist Sonia Dridi entitled “Sexual harassment, an Egyptian disease". The documentary which included interviews with Mona Eltahawy and other Egyptian activists closely followed the Tahrir Bodyguard team during their preparations and as they patrolled the vicinity of Tahrir Square. In March 2013, Soraya appeared alongside Harassmap’s Ebaa El-Tamami in a special episode of the widely popular show Al Bernameg hosted by Bassem Youssef .  The episode was fully dedicated to tackling the issue of sexual harassment of women in Egypt and utilized humor and satire to dispel many of the misconceptions about the topic, especially those that place the blame on women. In May 2013, Soraya gave a speech on women in Egypt at the Oslo Freedom Forum entitled “The voice of a woman is a revolution”. In her speech she described the courage that women showed in protesting alongside men during the Egyptian Revolution of 2011 and denounced the attacks and harassment they have faced since then. She also highlighted the pandemic of mob sexual assaults in Tahrir Square and the various efforts by civilians to combat these assaults. “We’re putting up a fight, we’re not afraid,” she said. “When they tried to silence Egyptian women, we became even more defiant.”
Following her speech, she participated in a panel discussion entitled "women under threat” that also included Lebanese journalist Jenan Moussa, British journalist and barrister Afua Hirsch and co-founder and assistant executive director of the Panzi Foundation USA Lee Ann De Reus. The panel discussion was moderated by BBC television Newsreader and journalist Philippa Thomas.

Honors and awards
In September 2015, she was one of 22 young Arab leaders selected for the German Bundestag’s International Parliamentary Scholarship program

In April 2015, she was chosen as one of 22 Mediterranean women leaders of the future by Sciences Po and the French government.

In March 2014, she was chosen as one of the mentees in the Fortune Magazine/ US State Department Global Women’s Mentoring Partnership held in collaboration with Vital Voices.

Education
Soraya is a graduate of the American University in Cairo.

References 

Living people
The American University in Cairo alumni
Finnish feminists
Egyptian women activists
Egyptian women's rights activists
Finnish people of Egyptian descent
Year of birth missing (living people)